"Smiling Faces Sometimes" is a soul song written by Norman Whitfield and Barrett Strong for the Motown label. It was originally recorded by the Temptations in 1971. Producer Norman Whitfield had the song re-recorded by the Undisputed Truth the same year, resulting in a number-three Billboard Hot 100 position for the group. "Smiling Faces" was the only Top 40 single released by the Undisputed Truth, and was included on their debut album The Undisputed Truth.

Overview
Both versions of "Smiling Faces Sometimes" deal with the same subject matter, "back-stabbing" friends who do their friends wrong behind their backs ("Smiling faces sometimes...they don't tell the truth...smiling faces tell lies"), but in different ways. The lyrics inform the Listener to not be fooled by the smile, the handshake, or the pat on the back. The Temptations' original uses an arrangement similar to a haunted house film score to represent feelings of fear and timidness. Included on the 1971 Sky's the Limit album, "Smiling Faces Sometimes" runs over 12 minutes, most of which is extended instrumental passages without any vocals. This version established the epic, cinematic approach to the group's productions that Whitfield would perfect on subsequent hits like "Papa Was a Rolling Stone" (1972) and "Masterpiece" (1973). An edited version was planned as the Temptations' summer 1971 single release, but this plan was dropped when lead vocalist Eddie Kendricks, frustrated by personnel problems within the group, quit the Temptations and signed a solo deal with Motown in March 1971.

Whitfield was known for recording dramatically different versions of the same song with different Motown artists, including Smokey Robinson & the Miracles' "I Heard It Through the Grapevine" (re-recorded as hit records for Gladys Knight & the Pips, and Marvin Gaye) and the Temptations' "War" (re-recorded as a hit for Edwin Starr). After Kendricks left The Temptations, an undaunted Whitfield re-recorded the song with his latest protégés, psychedelic trio the Undisputed Truth. Their version is noted for the line: "Can You Dig It". Billboard ranked the resulting single as the #14 song for 1971. It has since been covered by Bobbi Humphrey, Joan Osborne, Rare Earth, and others.

Future Undisputed Truth singles would never make it higher than #63, a position attained by both 1972's "Papa Was a Rollin' Stone" and 1974's "Help Yourself". "Papa Was a Rollin' Stone" was re-recorded by The Temptations shortly after its release, and this re-recorded version became not only a #1 pop hit, but a three-time Grammy Award winner as well.

The O'Jays' similarly themed 1972 hit "Back Stabbers" quotes the lyrics "smiling faces, smiling faces sometimes...(tell lies)" in the refrain near the end of the song.

Whitfield later revisited the song for the 1973 album Ma, recorded by Motown's white rock band, Rare Earth, which he produced and wrote.

Virginia "Vee" McDonald, who was the female lead singer in the second incarnation of The Undisputed Truth (after Brenda Evans and Billie Calvin left in 1973), recorded a solo version of the song in 1990 for Ian Levine and his Motorcity Records project.

Chart history

Weekly charts

Year-end charts

In popular culture
 In 1995, it was featured in the film Dead Presidents.
 In 2013, "Smiling Faces Sometimes" was featured in the video game Grand Theft Auto V.
 In 2019, "Smiling Faces Sometimes" was featured in American Soul, Season 1 Episode 1 "Man is First Destiny".
 In 2017, "Smiling Faces Sometimes" was featured in the TV series Snowfall.
 In 2005, "Smiling Faces Sometimes" was featured in the movie Four Brothers.

Personnel
 Written by Norman Whitfield and Barrett Strong
 Produced by Norman Whitfield
 Instrumentation by the Funk Brothers

Temptations version
 Lead vocals by Eddie Kendricks and Dennis Edwards
 Background vocals by Dennis Edwards, Melvin Franklin, Paul Williams, Eddie Kendricks, and Otis Williams

Undisputed Truth version
 Lead and background vocals by Joe Harris, Billie Rae Calvin, and Brenda Joyce

East Of Underground version
 Released on their self-titled album in 1971 and re-issued in 2007.

Bobbi Humphrey version
 Released on her 1972 album Dig This!.

Rare Earth version
 Released on their 1973 album Ma, also produced by Norman Whitfield, with lead vocals by Peter Hoorelbeke. Contains Spanish lyrics at the beginning that are ignored in all transcriptions of the lyrics.

David Ruffin version
 Released on his 1974 album Me 'N Rock 'N Roll Are Here To Stay, also produced by Norman Whitfield.

Joan Osborne version
 Released on her 2002 album How Sweet It Is with Isaac Hayes

References

External links 
 List of cover versions of "Smiling Faces Sometimes" at SecondHandSongs.com
 

1971 singles
The Temptations songs
Songs written by Barrett Strong
Songs written by Norman Whitfield
Psychedelic soul songs
Song recordings produced by Norman Whitfield
Cashbox number-one singles
1971 songs
Gordy Records singles
David Ruffin songs